Eupithecia singhalensis is a moth in the family Geometridae. It is found in Sri Lanka.

The wingspan is about 18.5 mm. The fore- and hindwings are white with pale to mid brown markings.

References

Moths described in 2010
singhalensis
Moths of Asia